Jessica Sibley Upshaw (August 31, 1959 – March 24, 2013) was an American politician and lawyer.

Born in Meridian, Mississippi, Upshaw received her bachelor's and law degrees from the University of Mississippi and practiced law. She served in the Mississippi House of Representatives, from Diamondhead, Mississippi, as a Republican from 2004 to 2013. Upshaw was found dead in the home of former Mississippi State Representative Clint Rotenberry in Mendenhall, Mississippi on March 24, 2013. Police investigated her death, an apparent gunshot suicide.

Notes

External links

1959 births
2013 suicides
American politicians who committed suicide
Republican Party members of the Mississippi House of Representatives
Mississippi lawyers
People from Hancock County, Mississippi
Politicians from Meridian, Mississippi
Suicides by firearm in Mississippi
University of Mississippi alumni
University of Mississippi School of Law alumni
Women state legislators in Mississippi
20th-century American lawyers
21st-century American politicians
21st-century American women politicians
People from Mendenhall, Mississippi
20th-century American women
2013 deaths